Berba, also known as Biali, Bieri, Bjeri, Bjerbe or Bialaba, is a Gur language of Benin. There are also a thousand or so speakers in the Kompienga Province of Burkina Faso, where they are believed to have originated;in the Savanes Region of Togo, and in Kwara State in Nigeria.

Writing system

The acute accent on the vowel  is used to indicate high tone when there is ambiguity.

References

Oti–Volta languages
Languages of Benin